Vanesa Tot (born 12 July 1999) is a Croatian canoeist. She represented Croatia at the 2020 Summer Olympics in Tokyo 2021, competing in women's C-1 200 metres.

References

External links
 

 

1999 births
Living people
Croatian female canoeists
Canoeists at the 2020 Summer Olympics
Olympic canoeists of Croatia
European Games competitors for Croatia
Canoeists at the 2019 European Games
20th-century Croatian women
21st-century Croatian women